Victor Rasuk (born January 15, 1984) is an American actor.

Early life
Rasuk was born in New York City, to Dominican parents. His mother worked as a seamstress, and his father at an auto shop. He has one brother, actor Silvestre Rasuk, with whom he starred in Raising Victor Vargas. Rasuk attended performing arts school as a teenager, and began acting at 14.

Career
Rasuk landed his first film role in the Peter Sollett-directed short film Five Feet High and Rising. Two years later, Sollett suggested expanding the short film into a feature-length film, Raising Victor Vargas, which earned Rasuk a nomination for Best Debut Performance at the 19th Independent Spirit Awards. In his next film, Rock Steady, he played a character named Roc. Two years later, he took a leading role in Haven.

Rasuk portrayed skateboarder Tony Alva in the 2005 biographical drama film Lords of Dogtown. The part included surfing and performing skateboarding tricks. Although the more complicated maneuvers were performed by stuntmen, Rasuk is a method actor and worked on remaining in character both on and off screen. Believing he had mastered skating a huge ramp in only his second week of training, he fractured one of his orbital bones. He says that the accident likely earned him more respect from serious skaters within the cast and crew.

Rasuk starred in the two-season HBO comedy-drama series How to Make It in America. From 2014 to 2015, he starred as Detective Ben Caldwell in the CBS drama series Stalker. In 2020, Rasuk played the male lead Daniel Garcia in the ABC series The Baker and the Beauty.

Filmography

References

External links
 
 

20th-century American male actors
21st-century American male actors
American male child actors
American male film actors
American male television actors
American people of Dominican Republic descent
Hispanic and Latino American male actors
Living people
Male actors from New York City
1984 births